Sir Edward Martin Furnival Jones CBE (7 May 1912 – 1 March 1997) was Director General of MI5, the United Kingdom's internal security service, from 1965 until 1972.

Career
Born in High Barnet and educated at Highgate School, Furnival Jones was a Gonville and Caius College, Cambridge graduate, having read modern and mediaeval languages, and law. 

He was admitted as a solicitor in England in 1937, joining the leading City of London law firm Slaughter and May. When the Second World War broke out, Furnival Jones was commissioned into the Intelligence Corps, transferring to the Security Service, MI5, in 1941.

He was Director-General of MI5 from 1965 to 1972.

Personal life
Jones resided in the Hampstead Garden Suburb. He was a tennis player and bird watcher and loved to perform in amateur theatre in both the local groups, including the Play and Pageant Union and Speedwell Players. It was during a production of I Remember Mama that he first met his wife, Margaret.

References

Directors General of MI5
Commanders of the Order of the British Empire
Knights Bachelor
People educated at Highgate School
1912 births
1997 deaths
People from Chipping Barnet